Hercílio Luz was a Brazilian politician from Santa Catarina.

Hercílio Luz may also refer to:

 Hercílio Luz International Airport, an airport servicing Florianópolis, Brazil
 Hercilio Luz Bridge, a disused bridge between the island of Florianópolis and the Brazilian mainland
 Hercílio Luz Futebol Clube, a football club in Tubarão, Brazil